Breeden is a surname. 

Breeden may also refer to:

 Breeden, South Carolina, United States, an unincorporated community
 Breeden, West Virginia, United States, an unincorporated community
 Breeden Creek, Missouri, United States

See also
 Bredon, Worcestersire, England, a village and civil parish